Rohidas Singh Nag (5 February 1934 – 30 December 2012) was the inventor of the Mundari Bani script, which is used to write the Mundari language.

History
Rohidas Singh Nag of Chandua Village in Mayurbhanj district is the inventor of Munda script Mundari bani. Rohidas Singh Nag was born on 5 February 1934 in Chandua village, Mayurbhanj district of Odisha. It was in the year 1949 Rohidas Singh Nag studying at class –III invented Mundari script and wrote the alphabets on the wall of school with the help of clay. In the year 1953, Nag was a student of class –VIII invented 35 alphabets of Mundari script. Further, Nag simplified Mundari script and in the year 1980 total 27 alphabets were selected for use. In 1980 Rohidas Singh Nag brought to the knowledge of the then Chief Minister of Odisha Shri J.B. Pattnaik on the development of Mundari script and submitted a memorandum to recognize Munda language constitutionally. In 1999 Rohidas Singh Nag with others submitted a memorandum to the then president of India and appealed for constitutional recognition of Munda language.

References 

1934 births
2012 deaths
People from Mayurbhanj district
Creators of writing systems
20th-century Indian linguists
Scholars from Odisha